Hownes Gill railway station served the town of Consett, County Durham, England, from 1845 to 1858 on the Stanhope and Tyne Railway.

History 
The station was opened on 1 September 1845 by the Stockton and Darlington Railway. It was known as Howens Gill in the early versions of Bradshaw. It was situated on the edge of a ravine, which meant that goods traffic had to be hauled up or down an incline if they wanted to go further. A bridge was later built across the ravine. The station closed on 31 October 1845, reopened on 1 April 1846, closed again in later 1846 but reopened again in January 1857, only to close permanently on 1 July 1858. It was in the handbook of stations in 1867, although it would have been an error.

References 

Disused railway stations in County Durham
Railway stations in Great Britain opened in 1845
Railway stations in Great Britain closed in 1845
Railway stations in Great Britain opened in 1846
Railway stations in Great Britain closed in 1846
Railway stations in Great Britain opened in 1857
Railway stations in Great Britain closed in 1858
1845 establishments in England
1858 disestablishments in England